Cueros de Purulla is a volcano in Argentina. It consists of a lava dome and an associated ignimbrite. A large eruption dated to c. 7820 BP deposited ash into the Valles Calchaquies.

Geography and geomorphology 

It is the northern of two lava domes which lie at the southern end of the Sierra de Calalaste and on its eastern flank. A second edifice developed within the collapse scar.

The volcano is accompanied by ignimbrites and a debris deposit consisting of obsidian lies at the foot of the dome. Two volcanic fallout units are associated with Cueros de Purulla. The upper unit is formed by ignimbrites and pyroclastic density current deposits.

The volcano is part of the Southern Puna high plateau, where during the Neogene-Quaternary volcanism associated with the Andean Central Volcanic Zone produced both calderas and monogenetic volcanoes. The basement under Cueros de Purulla consists of Ordovician sediments, which are metamorphosed and intruded by volcanic rocks. This basement during the Permian was covered by continental sediments, and later during the Miocene to Holocene by volcanic rocks.

Composition and ores 

Volcanic rocks erupted at Cueros de Purulla are rhyolites that define a potassium-rich calc-alkaline suite. Mineralogically, the rocks contain allanite, amphibole, apatite, biotite, clinopyroxene, epidote, feldspar, ilmenite, magnetite, muscovite, quartz, titanite and zircon. The volcanic rocks have been subdivided into three separate units, depending on whether they formed before the collapse or after it took place.

Reportedly, gold and silver can be found at the volcano.

Eruption history 

The lava dome at Cueros de Purulla is 400,000 ± 100,000 years old and produced volcanic units that resemble the older volcanics of Cerro Blanco; some were originally attributed to that volcano. At first, "coulee" lava flows were erupted and a large lava dome grew. After the collapse, the same processes rebuild part of the volcano. Notably, there is no indication that Cueros de Purulla produced block-and-ash flows. Based on the stratigraphic relations with volcanic rocks from Cerro Blanco, Cueros de Purulla was active during the last 73,000 years.

The "El Paso ash" in the Tafí valley was emplaced between 11802 and 4289 years before present and may originate at Cueros de Purulla volcano. A large eruption occurred during the Holocene, 7820 years before present (i.e. about 5870 BC). Deposits from this eruption form the Cerro Paranilla Ash in the Calchaquí Valleys. The eruption was highly explosive, forming a buoyant cloud and depositing tephra as far as Cafayate in the Salta Province.

See also 

 Cerro Torta

References

Sources 

 
 
 

Volcanoes of Argentina
Holocene lava domes
Pleistocene lava domes